The 1940 United States presidential election in Oklahoma took place on November 5, 1940, as part of the 1940 United States presidential election. Voters chose 11 representatives, or electors, to the Electoral College, who voted for president and vice president.

Oklahoma was won by incumbent President Franklin D. Roosevelt (D–New York), running with Secretary Henry A. Wallace, with 57.41% of the popular vote, against Wendell Willkie (R–New York), running with Minority Leader Charles L. McNary, with 42.23% of the popular vote.

Results

Results by county

See also
 United States presidential elections in Oklahoma

References

Oklahoma
1940
1940 Oklahoma elections